Luis Viracocha Quishpe (born 1954, in Quito) is an Ecuadorian artist, teacher, and shaman.

Viracocha is an abstract sculptor who uses stone, wood, and marble to create his artwork. Both his grandfather and father were sculptors.

Luis Viracocha has a bachelor's in applied arts and a doctorate in educational science from the Central University of Ecuador. He studied the restoration of architectural monuments in Venice, and earned a master's degree in Sculpture in Carrara, Italy.

His artwork has been exhibited in various countries outside of Ecuador including the United States, Arab Emirates, China and Austria.

Awards
 First Prize in Sculpture from the Mariano Aguilera Hall, (Quito, 1985)
 Second Prize of the Fifth Symposium of Sculpture, (Italy, 1983)

References 

Ecuadorian sculptors
Living people
1954 births